Dragon Ball Z: The Tree of Might, also known by its Japanese title  or Toei's own English title Super Battle in the World, is a 1990 Japanese anime science fantasy martial arts film and the third Dragon Ball Z feature film. It was originally released in Japan on July 7 between episodes 54 and 55 of DBZ, at the "Toei Anime Fair" film festival, where it was shown as part of an Akira Toriyama-themed triple feature titled Toriyama Akira: The World (the other two films were anime versions of his one-shot stories Kennosuke-sama and Pink).

Plot

A forest fire interrupts a camping trip enjoyed by Gohan, Krillin, Bulma and Oolong. Gohan and Krillin manage to put out the fire and use the Dragon Balls to restore the forest and the animals that were killed by the inferno, and Gohan befriends a small dragon he names Icarus. Unbeknownst to the group, the fire was started by a probe sent by a Saiyan space pirate named Turles, who bears a striking resemblance to Goku and who has chosen the Earth to plant the tree of might, which absorbs the life of a planet and converts it into fruit that when eaten, gives the consumer a massive power increase. Turles' henchmen plant the seed and King Kai telepathically warns Goku of the danger. He, Krillin, Yamcha, Tien Shinhan, and Chiaotzu attempt to destroy the tree using energy blasts but fail. Turles' henchmen attack and overwhelm them. The Earth begins to succumb to the devastation of the tree's life absorption as water vanishes and plants and animals begin to perish.

After Gohan fights back against the henchmen, Turles enters the fray after realizing Gohan is part-Saiyan and deduces that he is Goku's son, who he states is from the same class of Saiyan warrior and thus explains their similar appearances. Gohan impresses Turles with his power level and is invited to join his conquest, but he refuses and attempts to fight Turles before Piccolo intervenes to rescue him. Turles forces Piccolo to protect Gohan and the Namekian is dispatched. Turles creates an artificial moon and forces Gohan to observe it, causing him to transform into a great ape (oozaru), who attacks Goku but is calmed by the appearance of Icarus. Turles injures Icarus with an energy blast, causing Gohan to go into a frenzy before Goku severs his son's tail with an energy disc, transforming him back to normal and saving him from Turles' incoming energy blasts. Goku kills Turles' henchmen and engages his evil doppelganger in battle.

Goku gains the upper hand against Turles, until he obtains a fully grown piece of fruit from the Tree of Might and consumes it. With the sudden surge of power, Turles overwhelms Goku until his allies come to his aid. As they fight Turles with limited success, Goku begins to form a Spirit Bomb, but the Earth, having been drained by the Tree of Might, does not have the energy left to properly fuel Goku's bomb which Turles destroys. However, the energy from the Tree of Might begins to flow into Goku and this allows him to create another, more powerful Spirit Bomb. Goku confronts Turles underneath the tree's roots and blasts him directly with the attack, launching him up the tree and destroying them both.

The Earth begins to heal as the heroes celebrate their victory. Piccolo meditates alone by a waterfall.

Cast

Notes
The narration provided by Doc Harris for the 1997 version was cut out when this version was edited into a single-part film.

Music
OP (Opening Theme):
 "Cha-La Head-Cha-La"
 Lyrics by Yukinojō Mori
 Music by Chiho Kiyooka
 Arranged by Kenji Yamamoto
 Performed by Hironobu Kageyama
ED (Ending Theme):
 
 Lyrics by Dai Satō
 Music by Chiho Kiyooka
 Arranged by Kenji Yamamoto
 Performed by Hironobu Kageyama ft. Ammy

Both songs were included on the 1990 compilation Akira Toriyama: The World.

English dub soundtracks

1997
OP (Opening Theme):
 "Rock the Dragon"
 Performed by Jeremy Sweet
ED (Ending Theme):
 "End Title"
 Performed by Jeremy Sweet

The score for the 1997 Saban TV version was composed by Ron Wasserman (although credited to Kussa Mahehi and Shuki Levy for contractual reasons). The background music and opening theme "Rock the Dragon" were recycled from his Saiyan / Namek Saga dub soundtrack.

2006
OP (Opening Theme):
 "Dragon Ball Z Movie Theme"
 Performed by Mark Menza
ED (Ending Theme):
 "Dragon Ball Z Movie Theme"
 Performed by Mark Menza

The score for the 2006 English dub's composed by Nathan Johnson. The Double Feature release contains an alternate audio track containing the English dub with original Japanese background music by Shunsuke Kikuchi and an ending theme of "Marugoto".

The 1998 Pioneer release, 2003 AB Groupe dub and Speedy Video dub all kept the original Japanese songs and background music.

Content edits

Funimation's first dub of The Tree of Might done in association with Saban Entertainment and Ocean was heavily edited for content and length, just like their dub of Dragon Ball Z.

In order to increase time for the film to be a three-part episode, several scenes from the series were added, such as when Shenron is summoned, when Turles, his henchmen, and Piccolo make their first appearances in the film, and most of King Kai's scenes.
Blood was completely edited out in the film and the violence was toned down as well. For example, scenes where a character was punched or kicked hard were blocked by flashes of light.
The scene where Turles forces Gohan to transform into a Great Ape by holding his face and forcing him to keep his eyes open was edited, having Turles hold him by his shoulders instead. At the same time when Gohan looks at the fake moon, no heartbeat sound effects existed in the Japanese and English uncut versions, but were digitally edited in background in the English edited version. During that same scene, when Gohan's tail grows out of his pants, the sound effect of it ripping through his pants were also edited.
The scene where Turles has his foot on top of Goku was edited.
The scenes where Gohan is nude after he reverts from his Great Ape form, were edited, but he was covered up by some means, such as adding extended lighting to the scene where Goku catches Gohan after cutting off his tail or adding a digital bush in front of him during the scene.

This dub edited the film into a three-part television episode, which first aired in North American countries during November 1997 as part of the show's second season.

In 2013, Funimation released the edited film on DVD of Rock the Dragon Edition, but instead of being presented in the episodic format in which it originally aired, it was presented as a stand-alone film on the final disc of the set.

Box office
At the Japanese box office, the film sold  tickets and earned a net distribution rental income of ,.

Releases
Funimation later sub-licensed the home video rights for the film to Pioneer Entertainment who, also in association with Ocean Productions, re-dubbed the film, and released it uncut on VHS and DVD on March 17, 1998, featuring the then-current English voice cast from the TV series, dialogue more accurately translated from the original Japanese script, and the original Japanese background music. Since then, Funimation released the edited film of Rock the Dragon Edition set with Ocean dub on DVD on August 13, 2013, it has 53 edited episodes of the TV series, plus two edited films of Dead Zone and The World's Strongest as they aired on Toonami.

Once their sub-license expired, Funimation also released the film to DVD in "Ultimate Uncut Edition" on November 14, 2006 as part of a film set subtitled "First Strike", also containing Dead Zone (1989) and The World's Strongest (1990), with completely new dub done by Funimation's voice cast. It was later released in Double Feature set along with Lord Slug (1991) for Blu-ray and DVD on September 16, 2008, both feature full 1080p format in HD remastered 16:9 aspect ratio and an enhanced 5.1 surround mix. The film was re-released to DVD in remastered thinpak collection on November 1, 2011, containing the first 5 Dragon Ball Z films.

Other companies
Other English dubs were also made by French company AB Groupe and Malaysian company Speedy Video. These dubs, which are notorious for poor voice acting, were never released in North America. While the Malaysian dub's cast remains unknown, it has recently been discovered that English-speaking actors living in France were involved in the AB Groupe dub. Some of these voice actors were also speculated to have dubbed animated shows produced in France, such as Code Lyoko and Chris Colorado.

References

External links
 Official anime website of Toei Animation

1990 films
1990 anime films
1997 American television episodes
Tree of Might
Films directed by Daisuke Nishio
Funimation
Geneon USA
Saban Entertainment films
Toei Animation films
Films about trees
Films scored by Shunsuke Kikuchi
Japanese animated fantasy films
Japanese fantasy adventure films